Roy Hamilton Bradford (7 July 1921 – 2 September 1998) was a Unionist politician in Northern Ireland and a government minister in both the Parliament of Northern Ireland and the 1973 Northern Ireland Assembly.

Born in Ligoniel in Belfast, Bradford studied at the Royal Belfast Academical Institution and Trinity College Dublin, where he was elected a Scholar. He then worked in British Army intelligence before moving to London, where he worked for the BBC and ITV. In 1960 he published a novel, Excelsior.

At the 1965 Northern Ireland general election, Bradford was elected for the Ulster Unionist Party (UUP) in Belfast Victoria, defeating David Bleakley MP of the Northern Ireland Labour Party. In 1966 he was appointed as an Assistant Whip, then in 1968 as Chief Whip. From 1969 to 1971 he was the Minister of Commerce, becoming Minister of Development from 1971 to 1972.

At the 1973 Northern Ireland Assembly election, Bradford was elected in Belfast East. He sided in favour of the Sunningdale Agreement and remained loyal to Brian Faulkner, and was Minister in charge of the Department of the Environment until June 1974. He stood unsuccessfully in North Down at the February 1974 general election. He followed Brian Faulkner into the Unionist Party of Northern Ireland after the collapse of the power-sharing executive, but in June 1974 he returned to the UUP. He was not elected to the 1975 Northern Ireland Constitutional Convention.

Bradford completed a second novel, Last Ditch, in 1982. In 1989 he was elected to North Down Borough Council, where he joined his wife, Hazel, in the UUP group. He worked as a journalist, writing an influential weekly column in the Belfast News Letter and also served as a councillor and Mayor of North Down. In 1996, he was an unsuccessful candidate in the Northern Ireland Forum election in North Down.

His papers were deposited in the Public Record Office of Northern Ireland. Roy and Hazel Bradford's son, Conor Bradford, is a presenter of Good Morning Ulster for BBC Northern Ireland.

References

|-

|-

1921 births
1998 deaths
Alumni of Trinity College Dublin
Members of North Down Borough Council
Executive ministers of the 1974 Northern Ireland Assembly
Mayors of places in Northern Ireland
Members of the House of Commons of Northern Ireland for Belfast constituencies
Members of the House of Commons of Northern Ireland 1965–1969
Members of the House of Commons of Northern Ireland 1969–1973
Members of the Northern Ireland Assembly 1973–1974
Members of the Privy Council of Northern Ireland
Northern Ireland Cabinet ministers (Parliament of Northern Ireland)
Northern Ireland junior government ministers (Parliament of Northern Ireland)
Scholars of Trinity College Dublin
Ulster Unionist Party councillors
Ulster Unionist Party members of the House of Commons of Northern Ireland
Unionist Party of Northern Ireland politicians